The 2011-12 season is AaB's 29th consecutive season in the top flight of Danish football, 22nd consecutive season in the Danish Superliga, and 126th year in existence as a football club.

Club

Coaching staff 

{| class="wikitable"
|-
!Position
!Staff
|-
|Head Coach|| Kent Nielsen 
|-
|Assistant coach|| Allan Kuhn
|-
|Development Manager - AaB Fodbold|| Poul Erik Andreasen
|-
|Goalkeeping coach|| Poul Buus
|-
|Team Leader|| Ernst Damborg
|-
|Doctor|| Søren Kaalund
|-
|Physiotherapist|| Morten Skjoldager
|-
|Physical trainer|| Ashley Tootle
|-
|Sports Psychology consultant|| Martin Langagergaard
|-
|U/19 League coach|| Jacob Friis
|-
|U/17 League coach|| Lars Knudsen
|-

Other information 

|-

Transfers and loans

In

Summer

Out

Summer

References

AaB Fodbold seasons
AaB Fodbold